Sankyo Seki Dam is an earthfill dam located in Chiba Prefecture in Japan. The dam is used for irrigation. The catchment area of the dam is 0.2 km2. The dam can store 14 thousand cubic meters of water. The construction of the dam was completed in 1939.

References

Dams in Chiba Prefecture
1939 establishments in Japan